Grihapravesh is a 1957 collection of short stories by Indian writer Suresh Joshi, written in Gujarati. The collection gave rise to a new form of short story writing in Gujarati literature, favouring language over plot.

Publication
The first edition of Grihapravesh was published by Chetan Prakashan in Vadodara in 1957. The second edition of the book was published in 1973 by Butala Prakashan, also in Vadodara.

Background
Joshi expresses his formalist approach in the preface, discussing his style of short stories and creative art in general. In the preface, Joshi explains his form of short stories which, according to him, should not have the element of bare incident. He places emphasis on the form of short story, rather than the content. As a result, in the stories of Grihapravesh, the words chosen carry deeper meaning.

In the preface of the book, Joshi details his view of short story writing:

Contents

The collection has 21 short stories. These stories represent various situations that come into existence as a result of malefemale attraction:

"Grihapravesh": This is the title story in the book, in which the author uses imagistic language to emphasise the tormented self of the protagonist, Suhas.

"Dviagaman": This story gives a metaphoric account of the separation between Harshadrai, the protagonist, and his family members.

"Rakshshas" ("The Demon"): While the protagonist is on the way to his bed-ridden ex-lover, who is suffering from tuberculosis, the narrative of their past love affair comes into the picture with vivid imagery of the horrors they experienced as children.

"Nal Damayanti": This short story depicts the life of a wife of an unemployed and poor man.

Reception
Grihapravesh set a new trend in modern Gujarati short stories, and gave rise to a new form of short story in Gujarati literature. The book, as well as Joshi's reimagining of the form of short stories, has been called 'revolutionary' in Gujarati literature. In a review of the book, Dileep Jhaveri wrote that the book was "the first to change the craft of telling a story and its definition in Gujarati in the middle of the last century".

Footnotes

References

External links
 Grihapravesh at Ekatra Foundation

Works by Suresh Joshi
1957 short story collections
Gujarati-language books
Indian short story collections